The Úslava is a river in the Czech Republic. It originates as the Bradlava near the village of Číhaň. It runs through the following municipalities: Plánice, Žinkovy, Nepomuk, Blovice, Šťáhlavy, Starý Plzenec, Plzeň. It empties into the Berounka in Plzeň.

References

Rivers of the Plzeň Region